The pterygomandibular raphe (pterygomandibular ligament) is a ligamentous band of the buccopharyngeal fascia. It is attached superiorly to the pterygoid hamulus of the medial pterygoid plate, and inferiorly to the posterior end of the mylohyoid line of the mandible. It connects the buccinator muscle in front to the superior pharyngeal constrictor muscle behind.

Structure 

The pterygomandibular raphe is a ligament that forms from the buccopharyngeal fascia. It is a paired structure, with one on each side of the mouth. Superiorly, it is attached to the pterygoid hamulus of the medial pterygoid plate of the sphenoid bone. Inferiorly, it is attached to the posterior end of the mylohyoid line of the mandible.
 Its medial surface is covered by the mucous membrane of the mouth.
 Its lateral surface is separated from the ramus of the mandible by a quantity of adipose tissue.
 Its posterior border gives attachment to the superior pharyngeal constrictor muscle.
 Its anterior border attaches to the posterior edge of the buccinator muscle.

Variation 
In foetuses, the pterygomandibular raphe is always very prominent. However, in adults, it may become less distinctive. It is very large and distinctive in around 36% adults. It is fairly small, and only an upper triangular portion visible, in around 36% of adults. It is not visible in around 28%, making the superior pharyngeal constrictor muscle and the buccinator muscle continuous. This may vary by ethnic group.

Function 
The pterygomandibular raphe is the common meeting point of the  superior pharyngeal constrictor muscle and the buccinator muscle. It holds them together, forming part of the mouth.

Clinical significance 
When the mandible is splinted for gradual realignment (such as to treat sleep apnea), the pterygomandibular ligament slightly resists the realignment.

History 
The pterygomandibular ligament was first noted in 1784.

See also 
 Raphe

References

External links 
 

Human head and neck